The Sheriff Road-River Terrace Line, designated as Route U4, is a daily bus route operated by the Washington Metropolitan Area Transit Authority between Minnesota Avenue station of the Orange Line of the Washington Metro & Sheriff Road NE & Lee Street NE (Sheriff Road) or 33rd Street NE & Blaine Street NE (River Terrace). Route U4 operates every 13-15 minutes during peak hours, and 30 minutes at all other times. Route U4 trips roughly take 30 minutes.

Background
Route U4 provides daily service between Minnesota Avenue station and Sheriff Road NE & Lee Street NE (Sheriff Road) or 33rd Street NE & Blaine Street NE (River Terrace). Because the U4 route is a short Metrobus route with low passenger demand, U4 has almost always been assigned the smaller sized 30-foot buses, as opposed to the regular 40-foot sized buses WMATA typically uses on many of its Metrobus routes. However, route U4 occasionally uses 40 ft buses if the 30 ft buses are undergoing maintenance.

Route U4 operates out of Southern Avenue division during the weekdays and Bladensburg division during the weekends. The route mostly utilizes the 2012 Orion VII BRTs but also regularly uses the XN40s based out of Bladensburg.

History
U4 originally operated as part of the "Sheriff Road-River Terrace" streetcar line, between the Deanwood & River Terrace neighborhoods of Northeast Washington D.C. The U4 streetcar line was later replaced by buses during the 1950s and eventually became a WMATA Metrobus Route on February 4, 1973 when WMATA acquired all four bus companies that operated throughout the Washington D.C. Metropolitan Area and merged them all together to form its own, "Metrobus" System. U4 kept operating on the same exact streetcar routing it had been operating on since 1949, even after becoming a WMATA Metrobus Route.

On December 3, 1978, U4 went through a minor rerouting change to divert into/serve the newly opened Minnesota Avenue station. The rest of U4's routing remained the exact same. The line was named the Minnesota Avenue Shuttle.

On January 22, 1984, route U4 was rerouted to operate between Sheriff Road and Capitol View passing Minnesota Avenue station in both directions.

In 2014, WMATA announced a series of proposals for route U4 that will be implemented in June 2015 if it was approved by the Metro Board. It went as the following:
 Route U4: Daily service at all times between River Terrace and Deanwood Station via the current route between River Terrace and Minnesota Avenue station, then via the current route of V7 and V8 from Minnesota Avenue Station to Deanwood station.
 Route U4 would no longer serve the portion of the current route between Minnesota Avenue Station and Sheriff Road.
 New Route U7 would serve the portion of the current route between Minnesota Avenue Station and Sheriff Road.

This rerouting was to create a better balance of capacity and demand on lines serving the Minnesota Avenue station.

During the COVID-19 pandemic, Route U4 was reduced to operate on its Saturday supplemental schedule during the weekdays beginning on March 16, 2020. On March 18, 2020, the line was further reduced to operate on its Sunday schedule. Weekend service was later suspended on March 21, 2020. Service was restored to its pre-pandemic schedule on August 23, 2020.

In February 2021 during the FY2022 budget, WMATA proposed to eliminate the U4 if it does not get any federal funding.

Incidents
 On September 5, 2017, a passenger was arrested after he spat on a U4 bus driver along Minnesota Avenue. The driver was taken to a hospital.

References

U4